Lala Lajpat Rai Memorial Medical College or LLRMC is a state-run Medical College located in Meerut, Uttar Pradesh, India. It is named after the Arya Samaj leader, Lala Lajpat Rai.

The college is affiliated with Chaudhary Charan Singh University, Meerut and was established in 1966.

The college is situated on the Garh Road, Meerut.

Courses
The college offers both undergraduate and postgraduate courses in medicine. Various courses like M.B.B.S and Bsc. Nursing run in the college.

Upgrade
The Government of India has decided to upgrade the institute along the lines of All India Institute of Medical Sciences as part of phase 3 of Pradhan Mantri Swasthya Suraksha Yojana (PMSSY), whereby the Central Government will bear 80% of the cost of upgrading and 20% of the cost will be borne by State Government.

References

External links
 LLRMC alumni forum
 LLRMC

Medical colleges in Uttar Pradesh
Universities and colleges in Meerut
Educational institutions established in 1966
Memorials to Lala Lajpat Rai
1966 establishments in Uttar Pradesh